The Isaac Homard House is a historic house at 1217 West 3rd Street in Little Rock, Arkansas.  It is a two-story brick building, with an ornate four-column temple front supported by fluted columns.  The gable above is fully pedimented, with a central field of slate adorned by wood carving.  Built in 1905 for a railroad machinist, it is a significant local example of Classical Revival architecture.  The building has been rehabilitated for use as professional offices.

The house was listed on the National Register of Historic Places in 2017.

See also
National Register of Historic Places listings in Little Rock, Arkansas

References

Houses on the National Register of Historic Places in Arkansas
Neoclassical architecture in Arkansas
Houses completed in 1905
Houses in Little Rock, Arkansas
National Register of Historic Places in Little Rock, Arkansas
1905 establishments in Arkansas